Steven Arnold Defour (born 15 April 1988) is a Belgian former professional footballer who played as a midfielder, currently manager of Mechelen.

He played 247 games and scored 23 goals in the Belgian Pro League for Genk, Standard Liège, Anderlecht, Antwerp and Mechelen, winning two league titles and a national cup with the second team. Abroad, he won the Primeira Liga twice at Porto and played in the Premier League for three years at Burnley.

Defour earned 52 caps for Belgium in an 11-year international career that began in 2006, and represented the nation in the 2014 World Cup.

Club career

Genk
Born in Mechelen, Defour played youth football with local K.V. Mechelen, moving to K.R.C. Genk in 2004. He made his Pro League debut on 30 October 2004 as a 78th-minute substitute for Paul Kpaka in a 1–0 home win over Sint-Truidense V.V. in a Limburg derby, and scored his first goal on 5 November the following year, also assisting in the 4–1 win over K.S.V. Roeselare at the Fenixstadion. At just 17, he became first choice, finishing the 2005–06 campaign with 26 games and one goal to help his team to the fifth position.

When Genk failed to qualify for European competition, Defour tried to move to AFC Ajax in the summer of 2006. Enraged by earlier reports that Ajax had approached the player to broker a deal without their consent, Genk did not accept the proposed transfer fee, and after protracted negotiations, Ajax pulled out of the deal. Defour tried to force a transfer by threatening to leave, using a Belgian law that allowed professional athletes on fixed-term contracts to leave their employers before the end of the stipulated term, but Ajax did not express a renewed interest in his services, and he ended up signing for Standard Liège for a much-reduced transfer fee, effectively breaking a gentlemen's agreement between Belgian sides not to sign under-contract players using the aforementioned law.

Standard Liège
Defour joined Standard on a five-year deal, being appointed team captain at the start of his second year after taking over from Portugal's Sérgio Conceição – he was just 19 years old. He received the Belgian Golden Shoe at the end of the season in the process, leading the Reds to their first league title in 25 years.

In late 2009, shortly after scoring four goals in 31 games to help Standard renew their domestic supremacy, Defour broke his right foot. During his period of recovery he received a letter from Alex Ferguson, manager of Manchester United, wishing him all the best in his recovery, and this led to persistent rumours of a switch to the English club, but he refuted these by saying "I do know that Manchester United are monitoring me – if everything goes well and I continue playing as I am, there is a better chance of me leaving than there was at the start of the season"; eventually, nothing came of it.

Porto

On 15 August 2011, Portuguese club FC Porto agreed to buy the sporting rights of Defour for €6 million, and he signed a five-year contract. He finished his first year with 37 official appearances and added two goals, helping his new team to win the Primeira Liga championship.

Defour netted Porto's second goal against GNK Dinamo Zagreb on 18 September 2012 in the group stage of the UEFA Champions League (2–0 away win). The following 13 March, for the same competition but in the round of 16, he was booked twice and subsequently sent off in the 49th minute of the second leg of the tie at Málaga CF, as the northerners lost 2–0 at La Rosaleda Stadium and 2–1 on aggregate.

Anderlecht
On 13 August 2014, Defour signed a five-year deal with R.S.C. Anderlecht, for €6 million. On 25 January of the following year, when playing at Standard Liège, he was sent off for deliberately kicking the ball at home fans who had unfurled a banner depicting his severed head under the slogan "Red or Dead". His ejection caused the visiting supporters to rip out their seats and throw them onto the pitch, and the banner received criticism from both the Royal Belgian Football Association and the league.

Burnley
On 16 August 2016, Defour signed for Premier League club Burnley on a three-year deal for a club-record transfer fee of £8 million. He made his competitive debut four days later, starting in a 2–0 home win over Liverpool in which he helped create the second goal by Andre Gray but was substituted early in the second half due to a lack of fitness. On 10 September, also at Turf Moor, he scored his first goal for his new team to open a 1–1 draw with fellow promotee Hull City, and was praised after the match by manager Sean Dyche.

Defour scored a 25-yard direct free kick on 26 December 2017, as Burnley led 2–0 at half-time in an eventual draw at Manchester United. During his later spell, he was constantly bothered by injury problems. His contract was extended in September 2018 to last until June 2020, but on 31 August 2019, he had it terminated citing personal reasons and a need to return to Belgium.

In September 2022, Dyche named Defour as the most talented player he ever coached in his ten years at Burnley.

Later career
In September 2019, aged 31, Defour joined Royal Antwerp F.C. on a one-year deal. On 16 October 2020, he returned to Mechelen 13 years after leaving the Achter de Kazerne, agreeing to a performance-oriented contract. 

Defour announced his retirement on 11 May 2021. On 17 October 2022, he returned to Mechelen as head coach; previously an assistant, he replaced the dismissed Danny Buijs. In his first game two days later, he won 2–0 at home to Standard.

International career

Defour was first called up for the Belgian senior team by manager René Vandereycken in May 2006, aged just 18. He made his debut on 11 May in a friendly against Saudi Arabia in Sittard in the Netherlands, playing all but the last minute of a 2–1 win; he scored his first goal on 6 September 2008, in a 3–2 win against Estonia at his club ground the Stade Maurice Dufrasne for the 2010 FIFA World Cup qualifiers.

Defour scored once in three appearances in qualification for the 2014 World Cup, opening a 2–0 win away to Scotland on 6 September 2013. He was selected for the finals in Brazil by manager Marc Wilmots, making his debut in the competition on 26 June in the third group stage match against South Korea after Belgium had already won their first two outings and sealed qualification, and was sent off in the last minute of the first half of the eventual 1–0 victory after a rash tackle on Kim Shin-wook.

Defour missed UEFA Euro 2016 due to injury and the 2018 World Cup, having been sidelined since that January. On 25 May that year, the 30-year-old announced his retirement from international football.

Career statistics

Club

International

Scores and results list Belgium's goal tally first, score column indicates score after each Defour goal.

Honours
Standard Liège
Belgian Pro League: 2007–08, 2008–09
Belgian Cup: 2010–11
Belgian Supercup: 2008, 2009

Porto
Primeira Liga: 2011–12, 2012–13
Supertaça Cândido de Oliveira: 2012, 2013

Individual
Belgian Golden Shoe: 2007
Belgian First Division Man of the Season: 2007–08

References

External links

1988 births
Living people
Sportspeople from Mechelen
Flemish sportspeople
Belgian footballers
Footballers from Antwerp Province
Association football midfielders
Belgian Pro League players
K.R.C. Genk players
Standard Liège players
R.S.C. Anderlecht players
Royal Antwerp F.C. players
K.V. Mechelen players
Primeira Liga players
FC Porto players
Premier League players
Burnley F.C. players
Belgium youth international footballers
Belgium international footballers
2014 FIFA World Cup players
Belgian expatriate footballers
Expatriate footballers in Portugal
Expatriate footballers in England
Belgian expatriate sportspeople in Portugal
Belgian expatriate sportspeople in England
Belgian football managers
Belgian Pro League managers
K.V. Mechelen managers